Day's grass mouse (Akodon dayi) is a species of rodent in the family Cricetidae.
It is found only in Bolivia.

References

Akodon
Mammals of Bolivia
Mammals described in 1916
Taxonomy articles created by Polbot